Lee Joon-ho (Hangul: 이준호, Hanja: 李準鎬, born 7 September 1965) is a South Korean short track speed skater. In 1990, he became the first Korean to win the Overall World Short Track Speed Skating Championships. Lee won a gold medal in 1992 Winter Olympics as a member of 5000m relay team. He also won an individual bronze medal in 1000m.

References

External links
 Lee Jun-ho-lee at Olympics.com
 Database Olympics
 

1965 births
Living people
South Korean male short track speed skaters
Olympic short track speed skaters of South Korea
Olympic gold medalists for South Korea
Olympic bronze medalists for South Korea
Olympic medalists in short track speed skating
Short track speed skaters at the 1992 Winter Olympics
Short track speed skaters at the 1994 Winter Olympics
Medalists at the 1992 Winter Olympics
Asian Games medalists in short track speed skating
Short track speed skaters at the 1990 Asian Winter Games
Asian Games gold medalists for South Korea
Asian Games silver medalists for South Korea
Dankook University alumni
Dongguk University alumni
Medalists at the 1990 Asian Winter Games
Universiade gold medalists for South Korea
Universiade silver medalists for South Korea
Universiade bronze medalists for South Korea
Universiade medalists in short track speed skating
Competitors at the 1989 Winter Universiade
Competitors at the 1993 Winter Universiade
20th-century South Korean people